Acrotylus insubricus is a species of band-winged grasshopper in the family Acrididae. It is found in Europe, Africa, and Asia.

Subspecies
These subspecies belong to the species Acrotylus insubricus:
 Acrotylus insubricus braudi Defaut, 2005
 Acrotylus insubricus inficitus (Walker, 1870)
 Acrotylus insubricus insubricus (Scopoli, 1786)

References

External links

 

Oedipodinae